The Ireland women's national under-20 basketball team is a national basketball team of Ireland, administered by the Basketball Ireland. It represents the country in women's international under-20 basketball competitions.

FIBA U20 Women's European Championship participations

See also
Ireland women's national basketball team
Ireland women's national under-18 basketball team

References

External links
Archived records of Ireland team participations

Basketball in Ireland
Basketball
Women's national under-20 basketball teams